The Annual International Conference on Real Options: Theory Meets Practice  is a yearly conference organized by the Real Options Group in cooperation with various top universities. Its stated aim is to "bring together academics and practitioners at the forefront of real options and investment under uncertainty to discuss recent developments and applications."

The conference has taken place in a different location every year from its inception in 1997. Notable keynote speakers have included Robert C. Merton of Harvard University, Myron Scholes of Stanford University, Robert Pindyck and Stewart Myers of MIT, and Stephen A. Ross of Yale.

In 2008 the conference was held in Rio de Janeiro, Brazil, in 2009 it was held in Portugal and Spain, in 2010 in Rome, Italy, and in 2011 in Turku, Finland.

External links
Annual International Conference on Real Options, official website of the conference

Academic conferences
Real options